Arise is the third studio album by British singer-songwriter Zara McFarlane. It was released on 29 September 2017 through Brownswood Recordings.

Accolades

Track listing

References

2017 albums
Brownswood Recordings albums